Chifra may refer to:

Places
 Chifra (Ethiopian District)

Music
 Chifra, a music album by Satariel (band)